Sónia Sebastião Guadalupe Ndoniema (born 15 September 1985)  is an Angolan basketball player. At the 2012 Summer Olympics, she competed for the Angola women's national basketball team in the women's event. She is 6 feet 2 inches tall.

Sónia is married to fellow Angolan basketball player Edson Ndoniema.

References

External links
 

1985 births
Living people
Angolan women's basketball players
C.D. Primeiro de Agosto women's basketball players
G.D. Interclube women's basketball players
Olympic basketball players of Angola
Basketball players at the 2012 Summer Olympics
Basketball players from Luanda
Power forwards (basketball)
African Games silver medalists for Angola
African Games medalists in basketball
Competitors at the 2011 All-Africa Games